Oro Negro Airport  is an airport serving Cabimas, a city in Zulia State in Venezuela.

See also
Transport in Venezuela
List of airports in Venezuela

References

External links
OpenStreetMap - Cabimas
OurAirports - Oro Negro
SkyVector - Cabimas
 

Airports in Venezuela
Buildings and structures in Zulia